San Lorenzo Isontino is a comune (municipality) in   the Italian region Friuli-Venezia Giulia, located about  northwest of Trieste and about  west of Gorizia.

San Lorenzo Isontino borders the following municipalities: Capriva del Friuli, Farra d'Isonzo, Moraro, Mossa.

References

External links
 Official website

Cities and towns in Friuli-Venezia Giulia